Templeville is a town in Caroline and Queen Anne's counties, Maryland, United States. Templeville is located near the Maryland-Delaware line. The population was 138 at the 2010 census. It was known as Bullock Town until the name was changed in 1847. The name Templeville derives from the Temple family, whose most famous member was Governor William Temple of Delaware.

History

Templeville is named after the Temple family. The Temple family resided in Maryland from the mid-1700s. It is believed the Temple plantation was located where Templeville and the surrounding area is today. A small, private cemetery for the Temple family can be found just outside Templeville. Some of the tombstones are still legible, although time has taken its toll on them. The most famous member of the Temple family was William Temple, Governor of Delaware. He was the youngest governor to serve in Delaware in all of its history. He was born in Maryland and moved to Smyrna, Delaware at the age of 18.

Geography
Templeville is located at  (39.136330, -75.768398).

Transportation
The main method of travel to and from Templeville is by road, and two state highways serve the town. Maryland Route 302 traverses the town from east to west, while Maryland Route 454 heads south out of the town from its terminus at MD 302.

Demographics

2010 census
As of the census of 2010, there were 138 people, 39 households, and 27 families living in the town. The racial makeup of the town was 47.8% White, 0.7% Native American, 50.7% from other races, and 0.7% from two or more races. Hispanic or Latino of any race were 60.1% of the population.

There were 39 households, of which 43.6% had children under the age of 18 living with them, 38.5% were married couples living together, 20.5% had a female householder with no husband present, 10.3% had a male householder with no wife present, and 30.8% were non-families. 25.6% of all households were made up of individuals, and 12.9% had someone living alone who was 65 years of age or older. The average household size was 3.54 and the average family size was 3.89.

The median age in the town was 27.3 years. 27.5% of residents were under the age of 18; 15.9% were between the ages of 18 and 24; 35.4% were from 25 to 44; 14.4% were from 45 to 64; and 6.5% were 65 years of age or older. The gender makeup of the town was 50.7% male and 49.3% female.

2000 census
As of the census of 2000, there were 80 people, 32 households, and 14 families living in the town. The racial makeup of the town was 77.50% White, 5.00% African American, 1.25% Native American, 8.75% Asian, 5.00% from other races, and 2.50% from two or more races. Hispanic or Latino of any race were 5.00% of the population.

There were 32 households, out of which 28.1% had children under the age of 18 living with them, 21.9% were married couples living together, 12.5% had a female householder with no husband present, and 56.3% were non-families. 50.0% of all households were made up of individuals, and 31.3% had someone living alone who was 65 years of age or older. The average household size was 2.50 and the average family size was 3.79.

In the town, the population was spread out, with 27.5% under the age of 18, 12.5% from 18 to 24, 26.3% from 25 to 44, 16.3% from 45 to 64, and 17.5% who were 65 years of age or older. The median age was 36 years. For every 100 females, there were 86.0 males. For every 100 females age 18 and over, there were 87.1 males.

The median income for a household in the town was $15,938, and the median income for a family was $24,375. Males had a median income of $26,667 versus $15,625 for females. The per capita income for the town was $10,202. There were 40.0% of families and 40.7% of the population living below the poverty line, including 30.0% of under eighteens and none of those over 64.

References

External links

Hispanic and Latino American culture in Maryland
Hispanic and Latino American working class
Poverty in Maryland
Towns in Maryland
Towns in Caroline County, Maryland
Towns in Queen Anne's County, Maryland